Kankakee Sands is a  restored tallgrass prairie in Kankakee County, Illinois and Newton County, Indiana. It is managed by The Nature Conservancy staff and volunteers.

History

This area is part of the Grand Kankakee Marsh system and the site of the largest natural lake in Indiana until it was drained. It was drained by the 1880s. The  Nature Conservancy purchased  of farmland in 1996 with the aim of restoring as a prairie.

Bison roamed through Indiana when the eastern pioneers first arrived in the state.  Explorers reported bison in the 1600s and 1700s. An 1824 traveler encountered a single bison near the modern location of the preserve and shot it. Bison were extirpated from Indiana by 1830. Twenty-three American bison were introduced to the Kankakee Sands in October of 2016. The bison are from the Wind Cave National Park. Bison were indigenous to Indiana until exterminated by 1790. The bison provide management of the grasses on the prairie. They prefer grasses and sedges, leaving the flowering plants, which support a range of insects and animals. In addition, the bison, reduce the height of the plants, supporting ground dwelling birds. As of 2021 the bison herd had grown to more than 90 individuals.

Flora and fauna
The preserve supports a wide variety of plant and animal species.  
772 plants: rattlesnake master (Eryngium yuccifolium), pricklypear cactus (Opuntia humifusa), beach wormwood (Artemesia caudata), roundheaded bush clover (Lespedeza capitata), Wild quinine (Parthenium integrifolium), 
Prairie: lead plant (Amorpha canescens), smooth blue aster (Symphyotrichum laeve), New Jersey tea (Ceanothus americanus), woodland sunflower (Helianthus divaricatus), rough blazing star (Liatris aspera), wild blue lupine (Lupinus perennis), downy phlox (Phlox pilosa), purple milkwort (Polygama polygama v. obtusata), bracken fern (Pteridium aquilinum latiusculum), Carolina rose (Rosa carolina), lanceleaf figwort (Scrophularia lanceolata), goat's rue (Tephrosia virginiana), lance leaved violet (Viola lanceolata).
Sedges and grasses: little bluestem (Schizachyrium scoparium), Pennsylvania sedge (Carex pensylvanica),
 Trees: white oak (Quercus alba), black oak (Quercus velutina), sassafras (Sassafras albidum),
Wet prairie: swamp milkweed (Asclepias incarnata), blue joint grass (Calamagrostis canadensis), fox sedge (Carex vulpinoidea), horsetail (Equisetum hyemale), blue flag iris (Iris virginica shrevei), cardinal flower (Lobelia cardinalis), great blue lobelia (Lobelia siphilitica), winged loosestrife (Lythrum alatum), hardstem bulrush (Scirpus acutus), green bulrush (Scirpus atrovirens), prairie cordgrass (Spartina pectinata)

68 butterflies: regal fritillary butterfly
153 bees

247 birds: Winter is the best time to see wintering owls and Rough-legged Hawks. From March thru June is best for seeing migrating and breeding prairie birds.
 Grasslands: American kestrel, bobolink, brown-headed cowbird, dickcissel, eastern meadowlark, eastern kingbird, field sparrow, grasshopper sparrow, Henslow's sparrow, horned lark, lark sparrow, mourning dove, northern bobwhite, ring-necked pheasant, Savannah sparrow, upland sandpiper, vesper sparrow
 Wetland-grasslands: American woodcock, common yellowthroat, Leconte's sparrow, marsh wren, Nelson's sharp-tailed sparrow, red-winged blackbird, sedge wren, swamp sparrow, yellow warbler, yellow-headed blackbird, Wilson's snipe
 Shrubs: alder flycatcher, American goldfinch, American tree sparrow, Bell's vireo, blue grosbeak, brown thrasher, eastern towhee, fox sparrow, golden-crowned kinglet, gray catbird, house wren, indigo bunting, loggerhead shrike, northern mockingbird, northern cardinal, orchard oriole, ruby-crowned kinglet, ruby-throated hummingbird, song sparrow, tree swallow, white-crowned sparrow, white-throated sparrow, willow flycatcher
Ducks: blue-winged teal, bufflehead, Canada goose, common tern, gadwall, greater white-fronted goose, green-winged teal, hooded merganser, horned grebe, lesser scaup, mallard, mute swan, northern shoveler, northern pintail, redhead, ruddy duck, ring-necked duck, wood duck
Marshes: American coot, American bittern, black rail, night-heron, great blue heron, great egret, green heron, king rail, least bittern, pied-billed grebe, sandhill crane, snowy egret, sora, tricolored heron, Virginia rail, white ibis, white-faced ibis, yellow rail
Raptors: bald eagle, broad-winged hawk, merlin, peregrine falcon, red-shouldered hawk, rough-legged hawk, sharp-shinned hawk, Swainson's hawk, northern harrier, osprey, Cooper's hawk
9 snakes: e.g. milk snake, bull snake, hognose snake
 2 lizards: e.g. six-lined racerunner, slender glass lizard
932 moths
10 amphibians: e.g. chorus frog, leopard frog, Fowler's toad, grey tree frog
33 mammals: e.g. plains pocket gopher 
7 turtles: e.g. eastern box turtle

Other Nature Conservancy bison herds
The conservancy maintains a dozen herds through North and South Dakota, Nebraska, Iowa, Illinois, Colorado, Kansas, Missouri, and Oklahoma. Conservancy bison herds:
Broken Kettle Grasslands, Iowa
Joseph H. Williams Tallgrass Prairie, Oklahoma
Dunn Ranch Prairie, Missouri

References

Protected areas of Newton County, Indiana
Bison herds
Nature Conservancy preserves
1996 establishments in Indiana
Protected areas established in 1996